John Elwood Price (21 June 1935 – 9 May 1995) was an American composer, pianist, ethnomusicologist, and music teacher. He composed approximately 600 musical works in a wide variety of genres. His works are widely performed in the United States by professional groups.

Biography
Elwood began to study piano when he was five years old. He was a musical prodigy. In sixth grade he wrote a piece for piano that he performed at the graduation ceremony. In high school, he learned (and composed for) orchestral instruments. He earned a Bachelor of Music degree in piano and composition from Lincoln University in 1957. There he studied composition with David Baker. In 1963, he earned a Master of Music at the University of Tulsa, where he studied with Oscar Anderson Fuller and Bela Rozsa. He later studied music at Washington University in St. Louis, working with Robert Wykes and Harold Blumenfeld. From 1957 to 1959, Elwood was the staff pianist at the Karamu House, a historic Black theater in the Fairfax neighborhood on the east side of Cleveland, Ohio. He composed incidental music for theater and worked as a vocal coach. He taught at Florida Memorial College, where he was Chairman of Music and Fine Arts and composer-in-residence. He then taught at Eastern Illinois University, and finally at Tuskegee University, where he began his employment as the Portia Washington Pittman Fellow and artist-in-residence.

Works

Works for orchestra
1950 Rhapsody Symphonique for piano and orchestra
1950 Serenade for Tulsa, for piano and orchestra
1951 For L'Overture, for piano and orchestra
1952 Dance for English horn and orchestra
1952 rev. 1955 Scherzo I, for solo clarinet and orchestra
1955 - 1975 Two Pieces for string quartet and brass
1. The Solent
2. Inertia
1956 Nocturne for a Winter Night, horn, harp and strings
1956 - 1,957 Episodes for piano and chamber orchestra
1957 Scherzo II, for Clarinet and Orchestra (Revision of Rhapsody Symphonique)
1959 - 1974 Concerto for cello and orchestra
1. Recitative
2. Spiritual
3. Variations
1963 rev. 1989 ... And so Faustus Gained the World and Lost his Soul (Whatever Happened to Humanity?), For chamber orchestra; revised version for orchestra
1968 Scherzo IV, for clarinet and orchestra
1968 - 1975 Harambee (Let's all pull together), for orchestra
1969 Concerto for piano and orchestra
1969 Editorial I, for orchestra
1969 Scherzo III, for clarinet and orchestra
1972-1973 Overture, for orchestra
1973 Scherzo for Cello and Orchestra
1974-1975 Two Pieces for trumpet and string orchestra
1. Spiritual
3. Jumpin 'Dance
1976-1978 Tutankhamen: Trumpets, trumpet, trumpet (tape), string orchestra and percussion
1979-1980 From Remembering the vainglorious Luminescene revealed on That Day ... at Olduvai, for orchestra
1980-1981 O Sun of real Peace, for chamber orchestra
1980-1981 Three Orchestra Pieces, for orchestra
1. Arawak
2. Citadel
3. Makandal
1983 Abeng, for horn and string orchestra
1987 No Ideology in the World (or out of it) is worth the death of a Worm, for chamber orchestra
1988 - 1989 Adams-Campbell: "Whosoever Will", for orchestra
1988 - 1989 Concert for tuba and orchestra

Works for band
1951 March No. 1 in C minor., For piano and wind band (dedicated to: Booker T. Washington)
1953 March No. 2 for piano and wind band
1954 March
1969-1971 Four Marches
1981 Booker T. Washington Speech: 1897 Boston, Massachusetts, for mixed choir and band
1982 54th Regiment, for choir and band
1982 We Wear the Mask, for choir, organ and concert

Masses and other church music
1957 Ps 2000, for baritone solo, mixed choir, woodwinds and brass, and percussion - text: the composer
1970, rev. 1975 - 1976, rev. 1977 Barely time to study Jesus, for seven readers, soloists and mixed choir, orchestra and percussion - text: Robert Chute poem about Nat Turner
1972 - 1973  Lest thou bless me, for speaker, mixed choir, concert band and organ - text: Robert Chute 3rd poem by black history
1974 rev. 1978 Magnificat, for alto, baritone, mixed choir, organ, woodwinds and brass - text: William Edward Burghardt Du Bois

Operas
1957	 College Sonata	
1972 - 1974 The Other Foot, Ray Bradbury

Theatre music
1955 Foresight of time and the University, monologue (a science fiction scene of the creation of the world) with clarinet, trumpet and percussion - text: the composer
1962 Entr'acte for "The chairs", horn, bassoon and piano - text: Eugène Ionesco
1965 The Tempest - text: William Shakespeare
1969 The Feast of Unity, for soprano, alto, tenor, baritone, mixed choir, flute, oboe, alto saxophone, two trumpets, two trombones, tuba, piano / harp, percussion, string octet, actors and dancers - text: Sam White, Sharon Lockhard and others

Works for choir
1953 Greenwood Rhythm, for dancers, mixed (or unison) choir, wind ensemble (clarinets, saxophones, horns, trumpets) and percussion - text: the composer
1962 -1963 The Damnation of Doctor Faustus, for tenor, mixed choir and chamber orchestra - text: Christopher Marlowe
1973 St. Peter relates an incident, for readers, soprano, tenor bass solo, mixed choir, (small) band and organ - Text: James Weldon Johnson
1976 -1978 Song of the Liberty Bell, for three speakers, baritone solo, mixed choir and orchestra - text: Lewis Allan
1985 - 1986 Harriet Tubman: Booker T. Washington speech Auburn, New York ... 1913, for mixed choir and orchestra
Confession, for speaker, soloists, mixed choir and orchestra - text: Nat Turner "Confession"

Vocal
1954 rev. 1958 Suggestion for the Century, men's quartet and orchestra (dedicated to Russell Jelliffe and John F. Kennedy)
1969 Song on a Poem of William Blake, for high voice and piano
1983 - 1984 Mandolin, for mezzo-soprano / baritone and small orchestra - Text: Rita Dove

Chamber music
1954 Meditation and Change of Thought, trumpet, horn, trombone and tuba
1954 Fanfare and March, for trumpet and organ
1956 Hymn and Deviation (Brass Quartet), for brass quartet (trumpet, horn, trombone and tuba)
1956 Sonata for tuba and piano
1957 Blues and Dance I, for clarinet and piano
1959 Duet for horn and trombone
1962 Quartet for violin, viola, horn and bassoon
1967 Lament for dancers, clarinet, trumpet, trombone and percussion
1968 Sonata for trombone and piano
1968 Trio for clarinet, horn and tuba
1974 Fanfayre, five trumpets
1974 - 1975 Sonata II, for tuba and piano
1. Recitation
2. Rag
3. Spiritual
1988 On the Third Day ... Osiris Rose, for double bass and piano
1988 Where are you Robert Johnson?, For instrumental ensemble
1992 Isis and Osiris, for bass, keyboard, drums and dancers
For three instruments, clarinet, tuba and piano

Works for piano
1977 5 Folksongs

Bibliography
Evelyn Davidson White, Choral Music by African American Composers - A Selected, Annotated Bibliography, Second Edition, Lanham, MD: Scarecrow Press, 1996, 226. 
Aaron Horne, David N. Baker, Brass Music of Black Composers: A Bibliography, Westport: Greenwood Press, 1996. 521. 
Aaron Horne, Dominique-Rene de Lerma, String Music of Black Composers: A Bibliography, New York: Greenwood Press, 1991.
Aaron Horne, Woodwind Music of Black Composers, New York: Greenwood Press, 1990, 145. 
Jacqueline Lynn Pickett, John Elwood Price: A coalescence of life, culture, and music in his Jumbo Deviation and I for unaccompanied double bass, Center for Black Music Research (618 S Michigan) in 1996.
Hildred Roach, Black American Music: Past and Present, Second Edition, Malabar, Florida: Krieger Publishing Company, 1992, 3668.
Madison H. Carter, An Annotated Catalog of Composers of African Ancestry, New York: Vantage Press, 1986.
Ruth E. Anderson, Contemporary American Composers: A Biographical Dictionary, Second Edition, Boston: GK Hall, 1982, 578.
Carol Tomasic, Alice Tischler: 15 black American composers: A Bibliography of Their Works, Detroit: Information Coordinators, 1981.
Eileen Southern, Biographical Dictionary of African-American and African Musicians, Westport, Connecticut: Greenwood Press, 1981, 478.Composers of the Americas: Biographical Data and Catalog of Their Works'', Volume 19, Washington, DC: Secretaria General, Organizacion de los Estados Americanos, 1977.

Awards
ASCAP Award
Ford Foundation Study Grant
Phelps-Stokes Research and Scholar Exchange Grant
Illinois Arts Council Completion Grant

References

1935 births
1995 deaths
20th-century American composers
20th-century American male musicians
20th-century American pianists
20th-century classical composers
20th-century classical pianists
African-American classical composers
American classical composers
African-American classical pianists
African-American male classical composers
American male classical composers
African-American opera composers
American classical pianists
American male pianists
Lincoln University (Missouri) alumni
Male classical pianists
Male opera composers
Musicians from Tulsa, Oklahoma
University of Tulsa alumni
20th-century African-American musicians